Coleophora afrosarda is a moth of the family Coleophoridae that can be found in such European countries as Portugal, France, Greece, Spain, and island of Sardinia. It can also be found in Tunisia of North Africa.

The larvae feed on Ecebalia, Salicornia fruticosa and Halimione portulacoides.

References

External links

afrosarda
Moths of Africa
Moths of Europe
Moths described in 1983